Dominic Akuritinga Ayine (born 6 January 1966) is a Ghanaian politician and member of the Seventh Parliament of the Fourth Republic of Ghana representing the Bolgatanga East Constituency in the Upper East Region on the ticket of the National Democratic Congress.

Early life 
Ayine was born on 6 January 1966 in Zuarungu, Upper east region of Ghana.

Education 
He earned a Bachelor of Arts degree in law from University Of Ghana Greater Accra Region of Ghana and GSL in 1995. He earned his LLM in (International Economic Law) at University of Michigan Law School in 1998. He then went to Stanford University Law School, in California, US for a JSD (Trade and Democracy) in 2006.

Personal life 
Ayine is a Christian. He is married (with seven children).

Employment 
 Lawyer
 Lecturer, Faculty of Law, University of Ghana, Legon-Accra
 Deputy Minister for Justice

References

Ghanaian MPs 2017–2021
1966 births
Living people
National Democratic Congress (Ghana) politicians
University of Michigan Law School alumni
Stanford Law School alumni
Ghanaian MPs 2021–2025
University of Ghana alumni